Murad Al-Rashidi (born March 12, 1991) is a Saudi football player who plays for Wej as a midfielder.

References

External links 
 

1991 births
Living people
Saudi Arabian footballers
Al Khaldi Club players
Al-Ahli Saudi FC players
Al-Taawoun FC players
Hajer FC players
Al-Raed FC players
Al-Washm Club players
Al-Adalah FC players
Damac FC players
Al-Jabalain FC players
Al-Najma SC players
Wej SC players
Saudi First Division League players
Saudi Professional League players
Saudi Second Division players
Association football midfielders